War Along the Mohawk, known in Europe as Fields of Fire: War Along the Mohawk, is a 1998 strategy video game developed by Edward Grabowski Communications and published by Empire Interactive Entertainment.

Plot and gameplay 
The game takes place in 1757 when France and England are fighting in the American Northeast. The player chooses a character at the start of the game and when that character dies the game is over. The player completes various missions and in between they spend their time at their fort fending off Native Americans or wild animals.

Critical reception 

The game received mixed reviews according to the review aggregation website GameRankings.

References

External links 
 

1998 video games
Strategy video games
Video games developed in the United Kingdom
Windows games
Windows-only games
Empire Interactive games